Two ships of the Royal Navy have borne the name HMS Relentless:

 was a  launched in 1916 and sold in 1926.
 was a R-class destroyer launched in 1942. She was converted into a frigate in 1951 and scrapped in 1971.

Royal Navy ship names